Yelhou Jagoi (English: The Dances of Lai Haraoba) is a 1995 non-feature Indian Meitei language documentary film scripted by Rajkumar Achoubasana and directed by Aribam Syam Sharma. It is conceptualized by Kapila Vatsyayan and produced by Indira Gandhi National Centre for the Arts (IGNCA), New Delhi. The film was screened at the Yamagata International Documentary Film Festival 2019, Japan.

Yelhou Jagoi was also screened at the second edition of Fragrances from the North East 2014, a three-day festival of cinema from the northeast. A special retrospective on ace filmmaker Aribam Shyam Sharma was organised at the International Film Festival of India in 2015 where 15 films of Aribam Syam Sharma was screened. Yelhou Jagoi was one of them.

Synopsis
Yelhou Jagoi is re-enactment of creation also known as Lai Haraoba, a dance form of Manipur. The myth of creation, re-creation, reflections of flora and fauna and the synergy of mankind and its endeavour are beautifully encoded in these celebrative enactments. From the story of creation and re-creation it manifests the living within the nature that express through 364 hand gestures (Khutheks) used in dance sequences called Laibou. The documentation highlights Nungnao Jagoi - through this Maibis express - the birth of a child and its growing process. Similarly, the Yumsarol looks at the construction of traditional houses. Again the documentation also highlights Panthoibi Jagoi, which celebrates romantic love of Lord Nongpok Ningthou and Goddess Panthoibi. Likewise, the film highlights the lesser known nuances of ritualistic dance form of Manipur within the broader spectrum of nature and contextualizing the creation and co-living with the nature itself.

Accolades
The film won the National Film Award for Best Anthropological/Ethnographic Film at the 43rd National Film Awards. The citation for the National Award reads, "For documenting authentically and artistically a traditional dance form of Manipur".

References

1995 films
Films directed by Aribam Syam Sharma
Meitei-language films
Meitei folklore in popular culture
Indian dance films
Indian documentary films